Yu Jin-san (hangul:유진산, hanja:柳珍山, 18 October 1905 - 28 April 1974) was a controversial South Korean politician, resistance fighter and activist. His birth name was Youngpil (영필 永弼), but as was customary in the period, he subsequently adopted additional names; Chinsan (진산 珍山) and Okgye (옥계 玉溪).

Life 
Yu was a child of a poor farmer in Geumsan county. In May 1919, he took part in the March 1st Movement. In 1923, he graduated Bosung High School and studied at Waseda University in Japan, but dropped out in his third year and returned to work for agricultural organizations in Korea.

In 1933, he left Korea for Shanghai and was appointed as liaison to the Provisional Government of Korea (대한민국 임시 정부 大韓民國 臨時 政府). In 1934, he was arrested in China by the Japanese police and repatriated to Korea. He managed to get away to the Manchuria region of Northeast China as a liaison of the Provisional Government of Korea. He was arrested again and deported back to Korea where he was imprisoned until the end of the Japanese occupation.

In 1945, Yu was released and joined Baekuisa(백의사 白衣社), the right wing terrorist group involved in the assassination of Kim Gu among others. In 1949, he joined Banminteukui (반민특위 反民特委), but the organization was soon disbanded. In 1950, he ran for the National Assembly in the new Republic of Korea, but was defeated. He succeeded in the 1954 elections and served as leader of the opposition party for a long time. He was a member of the 3rd, 4th, 5th, 7th, 9th sessions of the National Assembly of Korea. 
 Kim Du-han
 Kim Gu
 Kim Won-bong

Popular culture 
 Portrayed by Lee Hyo-jung in the 2002-2003 SBS TV series Rustic Period.

References

External links 
 Yu Chin-san, Member of National Assembly of Korea 
 Yu Chin-san 
 Yu Chin-san 

1905 births
1974 deaths
Korean politicians
Korean independence activists
People imprisoned on charges of terrorism
Korean revolutionaries
South Korean anti-communists